Peggy Judd was a member of the Arizona House of Representatives, representing Arizona's 25th District from January 2011 until January 2013.

In November 2016, Peggy Judd won a seat with the Cochise County Board of Supervisors. 

On October 9, 2020, the Arizona Board of Appeals "REVERSED AND REMANDED" a lower court's dismissal of Welch v. Cochise County Board of Supervisors. "David Welch appeals from the trial court’s dismissal of his claims against the Cochise County Board of Supervisors and members Peggy Judd, Ann English, and Patrick Call (collectively, “the board”) relating to the board’s decision to appoint Call as a justice of the peace. Welch contends the court erred in concluding he lacked standing and had failed to state claims on which relief could be granted. Because Welch has standing as a taxpayer and has sufficiently pleaded violations of Arizona’s open-meeting and conflict-of-interest statutes, we reverse."

On January 6, 2021, Judd attended the Stop the Steal rally and March that led to the Capitol Insurrection.  Subsequent reporting by the Tucson Sentinel showed Judd subscribes to the disproven Q-Anon conspiracy theory movement.

On September 23, 2021, a Cochise County citizen submitted an Application for Recall in response to allegations Peggy Judd violated A.R.S. 38-231: Oath of Office.

On November 28, 2022, Peggy committed a felony by refusing to certify the election by the legal deadline.

References

Republican Party members of the Arizona House of Representatives
1962 births
Living people